Owstonia taeniosoma is a species of marine ray-finned fish belonging to the family Cepolidae, the bandfishes. It is known from the Indo-West Pacific region.

Taxonomy
Owstonia taeniosoma was first formally described in 1935 as Pseudocepola taenisoma by the Japanese ichthyologist Toshiji Kamohara with the type locality given as "off Mimase", in the vicinity of Kochi in Kochi Prefecture in Japan. The specific name is a compound of taenia meaning a "band" or "ribbon" and  soma meaning "body", a reference to its “much elongated” body compared to other Owstonine bandfishes.

Characters
Owstonia taeniosoma is relatively elongated compared to most species of Owstonia. Its dorsal fin has 3 spines and 26-26 soft rays while the anal fin has 1 spine and 18-19 soft rays. The caudal fin is pointed, like a spearhead, in shape. In living fish the colour of the dorsal and anal is pale reddish, with a wide horizontal yellow band running along the centre of each fin with a whitish fin margin and the front part of the anal fin is whitish. The pectoral fin is also pale reddish and the ventral fin are pale. The caudal fin yellowish with a whitish margin. Its bright yellow iris is unusual in the genus.

Distribution and habitat
Owstonia taeniosoma has been recorded from Japan, the Andaman Sea, New Caledonia and eastern Australia.

References

taeniosoma
Marine fish genera
Taxa named by Toshiji Kamohara
Fish described in 1935